Seung-min, also spelled Sung-min, is a Korean unisex given name. Its meaning differs based on the hanja used to write each syllable of the name. There are 15 hanja with the reading "seung" and 27 hanja with the reading "min" on the South Korean government's official list of hanja which may be registered for use in given names.

People with this name include:
Yoo Seong-min (born 1958), South Korean male politician
Ryu Seung-min (born 1982), South Korean male table tennis player
Park Seung-min (born 1983), South Korean male football midfielder
Seung Min Kim (born 1985), American female journalist
Song Seung-min (born 1992), South Korean male football striker
Baek Seung-min (born 1986), South Korean male football midfielder
Hyun Seung-min (born 1999), South Korean actress
Lee Seung-min, South Korean female taekwondo coach

See also
List of Korean given names

References

Korean unisex given names